WHSK (91.1 FM, "The HUSKY") is a college radio station licensed to serve the community of Bloomsburg, Pennsylvania. The station is owned by Bloomsburg University of Pennsylvania, and airs a variety format.

The station was assigned the call sign WBUQ by the Federal Communications Commission on October 11, 1984. It changed the call sign to WHSK on July 3, 2019.

Previous logo

References

External links
 Official Website
 

HSK
HSK
Radio stations established in 1985
1985 establishments in Pennsylvania
Variety radio stations in the United States
Columbia County, Pennsylvania
Bloomsburg University of Pennsylvania